Rudolf Herrnstadt (18 March 190328 August 1966) was a German journalist and communist politicianmost notable for his anti-fascist activity as an exile from the Nazi German regime in the Soviet Union during the war and as a journalist in East Germany until his death, where he and Wilhelm Zaisser represented the anti-Ulbricht wing of the Socialist Unity Party (SED) in the 1950s.

Biography
Herrnstadt was born in the Upper Silesian city of Gleiwitz (now Gliwice, Poland), where his father was employed as a lawyer. He began studying law in Heidelberg in 1922, but moved towards writing instead, becoming a journalist for the left-wing Berliner Tageblatt in 1929. He began working for the newspaper in 1925 as a typesetter. He joined the Communist Party of Germany (KPD) in 1929, fleeing the country in 1933, when the arrival of Adolf Hitler at the seat of power made Herrnstadt a target, both as an unrepentant communist activist and as a Jew.

Abroad
Herrnstadt came to work for Soviet intelligence in the 1930s and spent most of the decade in Warsaw. With the invasion of Poland by the Wehrmacht in 1939, Herrnstadt fled to the Soviet Union and came to reside in Moscow, where he applied and was accepted into the Communist Party of the Soviet Union. Despite criticism from some members of the German exile community for his "anti-revolutionary" views, Herrnstadt was among the members of the National Committee for a Free Germany. He returned to Germany as a member of the Sobottka Group, which laid the groundwork for the Soviet Military Administration in Germany in Mecklenburg.

Against Walter Ulbricht

After the death of Joseph Stalin in 1953 Walter Ulbricht was summoned for a visit to Moscow with the new Soviet leadership, where he was criticized for his introduction of collective farms and a slower course towards socialist construction. Herrnstadt was among the domestic critics of Ulbricht's line of the SED as a leading politician with candidate member status in the SED's Politburo and chief editor of the Neues Deutschland; a key ally during this time was Wilhelm Zaisser, who criticized Ulbricht from his position as the country's Minister of State Security and a leading party ideologist. However, Herrnstadt's dissension against the course of the Ulbricht faction was also criticized by Soviet adviser Vladimir Semyonov, who answered Herrnstadt's attack by replying that "in two weeks you may no longer have a state."

Ulbricht-led East Germany had pursued a course of reform since March 1953. After the 1953 East German Uprising, which initially weakened Ulbricht's position in the SED and the Soviet Union, Zaisser issued a Politburo motion to replace Ulbricht with Herrnstadt as SED First Secretary. However, the situation reversed after Nikita Khrushchev consolidated power over the Soviet government in Moscow and purged Ulbricht's opponent Lavrentiy Beria. Herrnstadt was removed from his position in the SED's Politbüro the same year. He was also removed from the Neues Deutschland at around the same time at the Ulbricht's request, according to the autobiography of fellow communist Markus Wolf.

Herrnstadt died on 28 August 1966.

References

1903 births
1966 deaths
People from Gliwice
People from the Province of Silesia
Jewish German politicians
Communist Party of Germany politicians
Foreign Communist Party of the Soviet Union members
Candidate members of the Politburo of the Central Committee of the Socialist Unity Party of Germany
Members of the Provisional Volkskammer
Members of the 1st Volkskammer
East German journalists
German journalists
German male journalists
German newspaper journalists
20th-century German journalists
Male journalists
Jewish socialists
Marxist journalists
German male writers
Red Orchestra (espionage)
German spies for the Soviet Union
Refugees from Nazi Germany in the Soviet Union
National Committee for a Free Germany members
Neues Deutschland editors